Soumendranath Kundu (5 January 1942 – 11 July 2019) was an Indian cricketer. He played first-class cricket for Bengal and Railways.

See also
 List of Bengal cricketers

References

External links
 

1942 births
2019 deaths
Indian cricketers
Bengal cricketers
Railways cricketers
Cricketers from Kolkata